Víctor Medina Cunningham (born 18 February 2001) is a Panamanian professional footballer who plays as midfielder for Deportivo Saprissa and the Panama national team.

International career
Medina made his debut for the Panama national team in a friendly 1–0 win over Costa Rica on 13 October 2020.

References

External links

2001 births
Living people
Sportspeople from Colón, Panama
Panamanian footballers
Panama international footballers
Association football midfielders
Cienciano footballers
Tauro F.C. players
Liga Panameña de Fútbol players
Deportivo Saprissa players